The Republic of Florida Militia (ROF) is a white supremacist group based in Florida that promotes hateful and anti-Semitic ideology. The group's goal is to form a white ethno-state in Florida and it engages in paramilitary training to further this goal. ROF borrows paramilitary concepts from the militia movement and has a small following in the Tallahassee area, as well as a small presence in South Florida.

ROF attends events organized by other white supremacist groups and spreads its hateful ideology online. The group has developed relationships and associations with other extremist organizations, including Vinlanders Social Club, League of the South, Atomwaffen, and the Traditionalist Worker Party.

ROF's leader is Jordan Jereb, is a convicted felon who founded the group in 2014. Jereb and other members of the group have made violent threats in the past, and while the group does not have a significant history of violence, its use of violent language has raised concerns, he was first arrested in 2016 for threatening a staffer in the office of Florida Governor Rick Scott In August 2017, Jereb was arrested a second time and charged with trespassing after allegedly entering his old high school with another member of the group. He remained in jail without bond at the time of the report.

In February 2018, the Anti-Defamation League (ADL) reported that Jordan Jereb, the leader of the white supremacist militia Republic of Florida (ROF), claimed that suspected shooter Nikolas Cruz was affiliated with ROF. This claim was quickly picked up by other media outlets, causing known white supremacists like The Daily Stormer's Andrew Anglin and Traditionalist Worker Party's Matthew Parrott to distance themselves from ROF and the shooting.

However, it was later reported that Jereb had recanted his claim of Cruz's involvement with ROF, stating that he had made the claim as a joke and had no real information about Cruz's alleged ties to the group. Despite this, the association between ROF and the school shooting brought additional attention and scrutiny to the group and its leadership.  In 2015, the Republic of Florida Militia (ROF) and the white supremacist group League of the South (LOS) organized a protest in Tallahassee, Florida against the Florida State University's Students for Democratic Society (SDS) group, who had burned a Confederate flag to protest increased Ku Klux Klan (KKK) recruiting in the area. The ROF and LOS protest included burning a Soviet flag in response. The event highlights the alliance between the ROF, led by Jordan Jereb, and the LOS, later forming its own paramilitary organization, the "Indomitables" its president, Michael Hill, has espoused anti-Semitic views in his online writings.

References 

White supremacist groups in the United States
Secessionist organizations in the United States